Eupithecia semiflavata is a moth in the family Geometridae. It is found in Kenya.

References

Endemic moths of Kenya
Moths described in 1902
semiflavata
Moths of Africa